The Fifteen Guinea Special was the last main-line passenger train to be hauled by steam locomotive power on British Rail on 11 August 1968 before the introduction of a steam ban that started the following day, the extra day added to allow for the movement of locomotive BR Standard Class 7 70013 Oliver Cromwell to Bressingham Steam Museum. It was a special rail tour excursion train organised for the occasion from Liverpool Lime Street via Manchester Victoria to Carlisle and back, and was pulled in turn by four steam locomotives during the four legs of the journey (with two engines sharing the third leg). The last scheduled standard gauge steam-hauled passenger services had run on 3 August 1968 from Preston. Steam continued to be used on the narrow gauge Vale of Rheidol Railway under British Rail, which was subsequently privatised in 1989.

Reason for name
The Fifteen Guinea Special was so named because of the high cost of tickets for the rail tour (15 guineas = £15 15s in pre-decimal British currency. Guinea prices were normally only used for luxury items or professional fees and ticket prices had been inflated due to the high demand to travel on the last BR steam-hauled mainline train.

1968 route and locomotives

The railtour started at 09:10 from Liverpool Lime Street station. The coaches were hauled by LMS Class 5 locomotive 45110, a late replacement for the original rostered engine, 45305, which had failed the night before with a collapsed firebox brick arch, to Manchester Victoria, arriving 8 minutes late at 10:42. There, 45110 was replaced with Britannia Class 70013 Oliver Cromwell – the last steam locomotive to be overhauled by BR – and the train departed for Carlisle at 11:06. The train arrived at Carlisle, 33 minutes late, at 15:29.

For the first part of the return leg, two Stanier Class 5 4-6-0 locomotives, 44781 and 44871, double-headed the train back to Manchester Victoria. The train departed Carlisle at 15:44 – 14 minutes late – and arrived in Manchester at 19:00, 12 minutes late.

Re-joining the train at Victoria station, 45110 then worked the remainder of the journey back to Liverpool Lime Street, arriving only 9 minutes late at 19:59.

Significance of the run
The end of steam-hauled trains on British Railways was a turning point in the history of rail travel in Britain. The BR steam ban was introduced on 12 August 1968, the day after the railtour, to enable Oliver Cromwell to make one last positioning run back to Norwich and on to Diss for preservation. This made the Fifteen Guinea Special the last steam-hauled passenger train to be run by BR on its standard gauge network (though BR would continue to operate three steam locomotives on the narrow gauge Vale of Rheidol line until it was privatised in 1989 and Northern Ireland Railways would continue to operate steam locomotives until 1971.) Thereafter, all mainline trains in Britain would be hauled by either diesel or electric power. The ban did not apply to one mainline steam locomotive – 4472 Flying Scotsman, due to Alan Pegler having secured a clause in the purchase contract when it was purchased from BR in 1963. After this, the only opportunity to view mainline steam locos in operation after the ban was to be on privately owned heritage railways.

Several other railtours had already marked the end of steam haulage on other parts of the British (not UK) network. During most of these railtours, the Fifteen Guinea Special included, the line was flanked with large crowds due to the high level of interest generated by their impending withdrawal and by the popularity of steam engines amongst rail enthusiasts. There was also a general belief that it was highly unlikely that steam would ever be allowed back onto the network, although in the event steam specials on BR lines were reintroduced only three years later. Since the "return to steam" with an inaugural special hauled by 6000 King George V in 1971, privately run charters have been allowed to use the mainline by arrangement provided that the steam locomotive has received necessary certification.

Preservation of the locomotives
All but one of the locomotives that hauled the train were immediately purchased straight from service and passed into preservation.

45110 now resides on the Severn Valley Railway and has been named RAF Biggin Hill, though is currently on static display awaiting overhaul. While not purchased straight from service, 45305, the loco replaced by 45110, was also preserved after being sold to Albert Drapers and Sons Ltd. of Hull, where the scrapyard's owner, Albert Draper, saved the loco simply because it was the cleanest engine in the yard. Named Alderman A.E. Draper in preservation after the scrapyard owner who saved it, the loco is under the care of 5305 Locomotive Association, currently based at the Great Central Railway at Loughborough.

70013 Oliver Cromwell is now part of the National Collection and was restored to mainline running in 2008, being based on the Great Central Railway when not on the main line.

44871, owned by Ian Riley, is currently mainline operational and resides on the East Lancashire Railway.

The only locomotive not preserved was LMS Black 5 no 44781, which was used for filming of the film The Virgin Soldiers at Bartlow, for which it was derailed and hung at an angle for visual effect. After filming was completed, an antique dealer enthusiast from Saffron Walden purchased it, but was unable to find the amount quoted by BR to recover the engine and re-rail it. It was then sold for scrap to Kings of Norwich and cut up on site.

As well as the three locomotives, two Mark 1 TSO coaches used in the train, 4933 and 4937, have also been preserved on the East Lancashire Railway at Bury, itself not too far from the route of the original railtour, and are both currently in passenger use in British Rail Blue & Grey livery, which both vehicles were painted in on the original run.

Re-runs 2008–2013

To commemorate the 40th anniversary, a re-run of the tour ran on Sunday 10 August 2008 (as 11 August was a Monday in 2008).

Five years later on the 45th anniversary of the run, another re-run of the tour ran on Sunday 11 August 2013. However, due to the original route from Liverpool to Manchester via Newton-le-Willows being shut for engineering works the tour had to be diverted along the route via Warrington Central to Manchester Piccadilly which hadn't seen steam traction since 1968.

Summary of run routes and locomotives

1968 run
 LMS Stanier Class 5 45110, Liverpool Lime Street to Manchester Victoria
 Britannia Class 70013 Oliver Cromwell, Manchester Victoria to Carlisle
 LMS Stanier Class 5 44871 and LMS Stanier Class 5 44781, Carlisle to Manchester Victoria
 LMS Stanier Class 5 45110, Manchester Victoria to Liverpool Lime Street

1993 re-run
 Diesel, Nuneaton to Leeds
 LMS Coronation 4-6-2 46229 Duchess of Hamilton, Leeds to Carlisle
 LMS Stanier Class 5 44871 and LMS Jubilee Class 45596 Bahamas, Carlisle to Leeds
 Diesel, Leeds to Nuneaton

2008 re-run
 LMS Stanier Class 8F 48151 (45110 unavailable), Liverpool Lime Street to Manchester Victoria.
 Britannia class 70013 Oliver Cromwell, Manchester Victoria to Carlisle.
 LMS Stanier Class 5 45407 (as first choice 44871 was under overhaul) and LMS Class 5 45231, Carlisle to Blackburn
 LMS Stanier Class 5 45231, Blackburn to Liverpool Lime Street

2013 re-run
 LMS Class 5 45305 (45110 unavailable), Liverpool Lime Street to Longsight
 Britannia Class 70013 Oliver Cromwell, Longsight to Carlisle
 LMS Class 5 45231 (44871 unavailable) and LMS Class 5 44932, Carlisle to Longsight
 LMS Class 5 45305, Longsight to Liverpool Lime Street

LMS Class 5 45110 was not involved in the 2008 re-run as its mainline certificate had expired. However, 45110 ran over the Severn Valley Railway on 11 August 2008 with a special 1T57 service. The locomotive remained in service until the end of August 2008, when an extension to its ten-year boiler ticket expired. The engine has since been on static display, first at Barrow Hill Roundhouse, and then at The Engine House at Highley.

LMS Class 5 45305 was allocated to the original train back in 1968 for the Liverpool to Manchester legs of the trip but failed the night before with a collapsed firebox brick arch and was replaced by 45110. It was however able to take part in the 2013 re-run. For the 2013 re-run the original route through Newton le Willows was unavailable due to electrification work so the tour went down the route via Hunts Cross and Warrington Central which hadn't seen steam traction since the end of steam in 1968. As a result of the electrification work it wasn't possible to reach Manchester Victoria so the engine changes took place at Longsight.

See also
"Last of the Steam-Powered Trains", a 1968 song by the Kinks

References

External links

 Two photos comparing the 1968 and 2008 IT57 Fifteen Guinea Specials, both of Oliver Cromwell arriving at Carlisle station.
 Two photos of the 1968 and 2008 IT57 Fifteen Guinea Specials at Carlisle station, each taken from the same spot.
 Photo (11 August 1968) of the Black 5s '44781' and '44871' emerging from the tunnel into Blackburn station on the double-header leg of the run.
http://www.facebook.com/media/set/?set=a.10151878514423781.1073741825.157739098780 Various photos of the Fifteen Guinea Special and the Fifteen Guinea Fellsman along the Settle to Carlisle section on 7 and 11 August 2013

Named passenger trains of British Rail
History of British Rail
1968 in rail transport